The UCLA College of Letters and Science (or simply UCLA College) is the arts and sciences college of the University of California, Los Angeles (UCLA). It encompasses the Life and Physical Sciences, Humanities, Social Sciences, Honors Program and other programs for both undergraduate and graduate students. It is often called UCLA College or the College, which is not ambiguous because the College is the only educational unit at UCLA to be currently denominated as a "college." All other educational units at UCLA are currently labeled as schools or institutes. 

The College is the largest academic unit at UCLA. The bulk of UCLA's student body belongs to the College, which includes 50 academic departments, 99 majors, 25,000 undergraduate students, 2,700 graduate students and 900 faculty members. Virtually all of the academic programs in the College are ranked very highly and 11 were ranked in the top ten nationally by the National Research Council.

The College originated on May 23, 1919, the day when the Governor of California (William D. Stephens) signed a bill into law which officially established the Southern Branch of the University of California. At that time, a two-year Junior College was established as the university's general undergraduate program.  The Junior College held its first classes on September 15, 1919 for 260 undergraduates.  

At its inception, the Junior College was truly a junior college in both name and fact, because it offered only a two-year lower-division program.  Young people interested in earning bachelor's degrees were required to proceed to the Berkeley campus or other universities to attend upper-division third- and fourth-year courses.  The inferior two-year program was intolerable to the many Southern Californians who had fought to establish the southern branch.  They vigorously lobbied the Regents of the University of California for a third year of instruction at the southern branch, which was promptly followed by demands for a fourth year.  The Southern Californians finally prevailed on December 11, 1923, when the UC Board of Regents approved a fourth year of instruction.  

At that time, the Junior College was transformed into the College of Letters and Science (named after its northern counterpart at Berkeley) and was expressly authorized to award the Bachelor of Arts degree. Charles H. Rieber, a philosophy professor, was named the first dean of the new four-year college.  The College's original departments in 1923 were chemistry, economics, English, French, history, mathematics, philosophy, physics, political science, psychology, Spanish, and zoology. 

On June 12, 1925, the College awarded its first Bachelor of Arts degrees to 98 women and 30 men.  

According to UC President Clark Kerr, the political science department at UCLA College in his experience was the second-strongest program in the entire UC system after the chemistry program at Berkeley. To date, three faculty members of the UCLA political science department have become UC chancellors (as listed below).

Divisions
The College encompasses five divisions — Humanities, Life Sciences, Physical Sciences, and Social Sciences, as well as the Division of Undergraduate Education, which includes 83% of UCLA's undergraduate students.

Division of Humanities
Art History, Asian Languages & Cultures, Classics, Comparative Literature, English, European Languages and Transcultural Studies: French & Francophone Studies, Germanic Languages, Italian, Scandinavian Section, Indo-European Studies, LGBTQ Studies, Linguistics, Near Eastern Languages & Cultures, Philosophy, Slavic, East European & Eurasian Languages & Cultures, Spanish & Portuguese, and Writing Center and Writing Programs

Division of Life Sciences
Computational and Systems Biology Interdepartmental Program (IDP), Ecology and Evolutionary Biology, Integrative Biology and Physiology, Microbiology, Immunology, and Molecular Genetics, Molecular, Cell, and Developmental Biology, Neuroscience IDP, Psychology, Society and Genetics

Division of Physical Sciences
Atmospheric & Oceanic Sciences, Chemistry & Biochemistry, Earth, Planetary & Space Sciences, Mathematics, Physics & Astronomy, Statistics

Division of Social Sciences
Aerospace Studies, African American Studies, American Indian Studies, Anthropology, Archaeology, Asian American Studies, César E. Chávez Department of Chicana/o and Central American Studies, Communication, Conservation IDP, Economics, Gender Studies, Geography, History, Master of Social Science, Military Science, Naval Science, Political Science, Sociology

Alumni

 Kay Ryan, English, 16th poet laureate of U.S.
 Brad Delson, Linkin Park member
 Richard Heck, 2010 Nobel Prize in chemistry
 Paul Terasaki, organ transplant medicine and tissue typing

Notable faculty

 Utpal Banerjee, department chair and professor of molecular, cell and developmental biology; professor of biological chemistry, American Academy of Arts and Sciences
 Jared Diamond, professor of geography, American Academy of Arts and Sciences, National Medal of Science recipient and MacArthur Fellowship (1985)
 Alessandro Duranti, professor of anthropology, American Academy of Arts and Sciences
 Saul Friedländer, MacArthur Fellowship (1999)
 Andrea Ghez, MacArthur Fellowship (Genius Grant winner, 2008), professor of physics and astronomy 
 Ivan Hinderaker, professor of political science and department chair, 2nd chancellor of UC Riverside
 Thomas M. Liggett, professor of mathematics, National Academy of Sciences
 Thom Mayne, professor of architecture, American Academy of Arts and Sciences
 Dean McHenry, professor of political science, 1st chancellor of UC Santa Cruz
 Calvin Normore, professor of philosophy, American Academy of Arts and Sciences
 Raymond L. Orbach, professor of physics, provost of UCLA College, 6th chancellor of UC Riverside
 Theodore Porter, professor of history and department vice chair for undergraduate affairs, American Academy of Arts and Sciences
 Charles Ray, professor of sculpture, American Academy of Arts and Sciences
 Debora Silverman, professor of history and art history, American Academy of Arts and Sciences
 Terence Tao, Fields Medal–winning mathematician, National Academy of Sciences, MacArthur Fellowship 2006)
 Paul Terasaki, organ transplant medicine and tissue typing
 Gordon Samuel Watkins, professor of economics, dean of UCLA College, founding provost of UC Riverside 
 Charles E. Young, professor of political science, 4th chancellor of UCLA

Commencement ceremonies
The main graduation commencement ceremony for the College of Letters and Science is held annually on a Friday night in June in Pauley Pavilion. For two years in a row, the scheduled commencement keynote speaker had canceled the engagement. Bill Clinton canceled in 2008 for not wanting to cross a picket line. Actor and alumnus James Franco canceled in 2009 because of his filming scheduling conflicts. Rock band Linkin Park's Brad Delson accepted the last minute invitation to speak at the 2009 commencement ceremony. Mayim Bialik cancelled in 2016 for not wanting to cross a picket line.

In various years, UCLA has received criticism from students for the relative obscurity of commencement speakers.
 2005 – Sesame Workshop CEO Gary Knell
 2006 – Mayor of Los Angeles Antonio Villaraigosa 
 2007 – Former professional basketball player Kareem Abdul-Jabbar
 2008 – UCLA chancellor Gene Block
 2009 – Linkin Park guitarist Brad Delson
 June 11, 2010 – Columnist Gustavo Arellano of '¡Ask a Mexican!'
 2011 – Former Peace Corps director Aaron S. Williams
 June 15, 2012 – Kiva and ProFounder co-founder Jessica Jackley
 June 14, 2013 – Basketball Hall of Famer  Ann Meyers Drysdale
 June 13, 2014 – Nobel laureate Randy Schekman
 June 12, 2015 – Intellectual Ventures co-founder Nathan Myhrvold
 June 10, 2016 – BlackRock Chairman and CEO Laurence Fink
 June 16, 2017 – Former UCLA basketball player and first African American woman LAPD area captain Anita Ortega
 June 15, 2018 – 
 June 14, 2019 – Former NASA astronaut  Dr. Anna Lee Fisher
 June 12, 2020 – Actor and activist George Takei 
 June 11, 2021 – Civic leader and social justice advocate D'Artagnan Scorza
 June 10, 2022 – Gymnast and activist Katelyn Ohashi

References

External links
Official website

Liberal arts colleges at universities in the United States
College of Letters and Science
Educational institutions established in 1919
1919 establishments in California